Mazarrón Club de Fútbol was a Spanish football team based in Mazarrón, in the autonomous community of Region of Murcia. Founded in 1969, it was dissolved on 2010. After the club's dissolution, a new club named Mazarrón FC was founded as a replacement.

In 1996, the club merged with CD Bala Azul, becoming Playas de Mazarrón CF. However, in the following year, the fusion was undone mainly due to the high rivalry between both sides.

Season to season

1 season in Segunda División B
10 seasons in Tercera División

Famous players
 Alexandre
  Alberto Edjogo
  Edwin Ouon
 Quini
 Diego Ribera
 Nacho Rodríguez
 Diego Meijide

External links
Former official website 
Club history 
Supporters website 

Association football clubs established in 1969
Association football clubs disestablished in 2010
Defunct football clubs in the Region of Murcia
1969 establishments in Spain
2010 disestablishments in Spain